The 2016 IFCPF World Championships Qualification Tournament was a tournament for men's national 7-a-side association football teams. IFCPF stands for International Federation of Cerebral Palsy Football. Athletes with a physical disability competed. The Championship took place in the England from 29 July – 6 August 2016 .

Football CP Football was played with modified FIFA rules. Among the modifications were that there were seven players, no offside, a smaller playing field, and permission for one-handed throw-ins. Matches consisted of two thirty-minute halves, with a fifteen-minute half-time break. The Championships was a qualifying event for the 2017 IFCPF CP Football World Championships

Participating teams and officials

Qualifying
The following teams are qualified for the tournament:

The draw
During the draw, the teams were divided into pots because of rankings. Here, the following groups:

Squads

Group A

Group B

Group C

Group D

Venues
The venues to be used for the World Championships were located in Vejen.

Format

The first round, or group stage, was a competition between the 13 teams divided among three groups of three and one group of four, where each group engaged in a round-robin tournament within itself. The two highest ranked teams in each group advanced to the knockout stage for the position one to eight. the two lower ranked teams plays for the positions nine to thirteen. Teams were awarded three points for a win and one for a draw. When comparing teams in a group over-all result came before head-to-head.

In the knockout stage there were three rounds (quarter-finals, semi-finals, and the final). The winners plays for the higher positions, the losers for the lower positions. For any match in the knockout stage, a draw after 60 minutes of regulation time was followed by two 10 minute periods of extra time to determine a winner. If the teams were still tied, a penalty shoot-out was held to determine a winner.

Classification
Athletes with a physical disability competed. The athlete's disability was caused by a non-progressive brain damage that affects motor control, such as cerebral palsy, traumatic brain injury or stroke. Athletes must be ambulant.

Players were classified by level of disability.
C5: Athletes with difficulties when walking and running, but not in standing or when kicking the ball.
C6: Athletes with control and co-ordination problems of their upper limbs, especially when running.
C7: Athletes with hemiplegia.
C8: Athletes with minimal disability; must meet eligibility criteria and have an impairment that has impact on the sport of football.

Teams must field at least one class C5 or C6 player at all times. No more than two players of class C8 are permitted to play at the same time.

Group stage
The first round, or group stage, have seen the sixteen teams divided into four groups of four teams. In any every match a maximum of 10 goals scored were counted. This is indicated with an asterisk (*).

Group A
<noinclude>

Group B
<noinclude>

Group C
<noinclude>

Group D
<noinclude>

Knockout stage

Quarter-finals
Position 1-8

Semi-finals
Position 5-8

Position 1-4

Finals

Group stage 9-13
position 9-13
<noinclude>
The match from the group stage Finland against Denmark (1–2) was included in the table.

Finals 1-8
Position 7-8

Position 5-6

Position 3-4

Final

Statistics

Goalscorers
15 goals
  Samuel Charron

12 goals
  Mehdi Jamali

8 goals
  Liam Stanley

7 goals
  Conny Fritsch
  Sean Stewart

6 goals
  Conor Lewsley

5 goals
  Aitor Arino Casoliba
  Matt Brown

4 goals

  Jasem Bakhshi
  David Leavy
  Ehsan Masoumzadeh
  Sergio Nicolas Clemente Munoz
  Hossein Tiz Bor

3 goals

  Amir Amjadian
  Phillipp Freudinger
  Janne Helander
  Vitor Vilarinho
  Jessi Junior Yari Villegas

2 goals

  Jamie Ackinclose 
  Lucas Bruno
  Beomjun Choi
  Marco Geisler
  Kyle Hannin
  Peter Hansen
  Sadegh Hassani Baghi
  Ryan Kinner
  Blair McGregor
  Robin Meyer
  Jonathan Paterson
  Ian Paton
  Pedro Santos
  Taisei Taniguchi
  Tetsuya Toda
  Tatsuhiro Ura
  Martin Wolf

1 goal

  Noe Adell Pla
  Ben Atkins
  Cormac Birt
  Harry Cheeseman
  Eduardo De Laorden Barcelona
  Nic Heffernan
  Temma Inoue
  Mikael Jukarainen
  Raji Kamoun
  Ville Kuronen
  Oliver Larsen
  Wiljami Laurila
  Luis Miguel Leal Ferreira
  Kieran Martin
  Emil	Møller
  Anderson Alberto Morantes Ramirez
  Haecheol Park
  Hugo Pinheiro
  Vito Proietti
  Jose Luis Felipe Quintana
  Tiago Ramos
  Benjamin Roche
  Seunghwan Lee
  Johannes Siikonen
  Jordan Walker

own goals

  Noe Adell Pla
  Phillipp Freudinger
  Lotfollah Jangjou
  Sangyul Kim
  Simo Mykkanen

Ranking

See also

References

External links
Official website
[ Official website from XX XX XXXX]
Cerebral Palsy International Sports & Recreation Association (CPISRA)
International Federation of Cerebral Palsy Football (IFCPF)

2016 in association football
2016
2015–16 in Danish football
Paralympic association football